Solidago albopilosa is a rare species of flowering plant in the family Asteraceae known by the common name whitehair goldenrod.

It is endemic to the state of Kentucky in the southeastern United States. It is threatened by recreational activities in its habitat. It is a federally listed threatened species of the United States.

Distribution
This plant species is only found in Eastern Kentucky, in a single river canyon, the Red River Gorge. It grows there within the Daniel Boone National Forest, in Menifee, Powell, and Wolfe Counties. There it is limited to rock shelters, open caves with overhanging rock formations. It grows on sandy soil that has accumulated on the sandstone floors of the rock shelters. It grows behind the drip line, out of direct sunlight but not in the darkest shadows of the caves.

Description
Solidago albopilosa is a perennial herb producing one or more erect stems from a woody caudex. It is covered in white hairs.

The leaf blades are "so thin that coarse print is readable through [them]."

The inflorescence is a cluster of up to 30 flower heads, each roughly half a centimeter (0.2 inches) long. The head contains 3 to 5 tiny yellow ray florets and a few disc florets. The fruit is up to half a centimeter (0.2 inches) long including its pappus. Blooming occurs in September through November.

Ecology
Other plants in this type of habitat and the surrounding forest include white baneberry (Actaea pachypoda), northern maidenhair fern (Adiantum pedatum), jack in the pulpit (Arisaema triphyllum), flowering dogwood (Cornus florida),  yellow mandarin (Disporum lanuginosum), smooth hydrangea (Hydrangea arborescens), Indian cucumber-root (Medeola virginiana), Nepalese browntop (Microstegium vimineum), partridge berry (Mitchella repens), clearweed (Pilea pumila), Christmas fern (Polystichum acrostichoides), great rhododendron (Rhododendron maximum), poison ivy (Toxicodendron radicans), and maple-leaf viburnum (Viburnum acerifolium). Roundleaf catchfly (Silene rotundifolia), and littleflower alumroot (Heuchera parviflora) are common associates.

Conservation
Conservation activities include the installation of small fences around the plants and the redirection of trails through less sensitive habitat.

The main threat to this species is damage to its habitat during recreational activities in this section of the Daniel Boone National Forest. Hiking, camping, and rock climbing are popular pursuits in the area. Trampling destroys the plants, compacts the soil, and damages the seeds and rhizomes. Explorers invade the rock shelters and build fires, dump garbage, spread the seeds of invasive plants like garlic mustard, and dig in the soil for archaeological artifacts. Logging opens the forest and increases light levels, decreases water, and increases the invasion of introduced species of plants, posing a further threat to the species.

References

External links
 
USDA Plants Profile for Solidago albopilosa (whitehair goldenrod)

albopilosa
Flora of Kentucky
Flora of the Appalachian Mountains
Endemic flora of the United States
Daniel Boone National Forest
Menifee County, Kentucky
Powell County, Kentucky
Wolfe County, Kentucky
Plants described in 1942
Endangered flora of the United States